Rhodopina okinoerabuana is a species of beetle in the family Cerambycidae. It was described by Masao Hayashi in 1966. It is known from Japan.

References

okinoerabuana
Beetles described in 1966